This is a list of Romanian actors, actresses, playwrights, and directors, whether on stage or in film. Most of these people made at least a significant portion of their career in Romanian-language theater, although some are merely of Romanian origin.

A
 Mircea Albulescu 
 Mircea Anca
 Violeta Andrei
 Kristaq Antoniu 
 Alexandru Arșinel

B
Marga Barbu (born Butuc), actress
Leopoldina Bălănuță, actress
Ştefan Bănică, Sr., actor
Radu Beligan, actor, director
Ion Besoiu, actor
Grigore Vasiliu-Birlic
Claudiu Bleonț, actor
Olga Bucătaru, film and stage actress
Tamara Buciuceanu, actress

C
George Calboreanu, actor, composer
Şerban Cantacuzino, actor
I.L. Caragiale, playwright
Toma Caragiu, actor
Ion Caramitru, actor
Florin Călinescu, actor
Liviu Ciulei, director, actor
Constantin Codrescu, actor
Roxana Condurache
Jean Constantin, actor
Geo Costiniu, actor
Octavian Cotescu, actor
Gheorghe Cozorici, actor

D
Iurie Darie, actor
Gheorghe Dinică, actor
Mircea Diaconu, actor

E
Fory Etterle, actor

F
Alex Floroiu, actor

G
Vladimir Găitan, actor
Luminița Gheorghiu, actress
Alexandru Giugaru, actor

H
Kira Hagi, actress and daughter of famous footballer Gheorghe Hagi
Manuela Hărăbor, actress
Emil Hossu, actor
John Houseman, actor (born in Romania to a French-born Jewish father and an English mother, made his career in the United States as an English-language film and television actor)

I
Aimée Iacobescu, actress
Șerban Ionescu, actor
Ștefan Iordache, actor
Marcel Iureş, actor

M
Ernest Maftei, actor
Alexandra Maria Lara (born Plǎtǎreanu), actress 
Nicolae Massim, director
Horațiu Mălăele, actor
Ștefan Mihăilescu-Brăila, actor
George Mihăiță, actor
Matei Millo, stage actor
Mihaela Mitrache, actress
Marin Moraru, actor
Maia Morgenstern
Florentina Mosora 
George Motoi, actor

N
Jean Negulescu, film director, Oscar nominee

O
Draga Olteanu Matei, actress

P
Sebastian Papaiani, actor
Oana Pellea, actress
Irina Petrescu, actress
Florin Piersic, actor
Adrian Pintea, actor
Margareta Pogonat, actress
Elvira Popescu, actress
Ion Popescu-Gopo, director
Mitică Popescu, actor
Rodica Popescu Bitănescu, actress
Stela Popescu, actress

R
Dem Rădulescu, actor
Colea Răutu, actor
Victor Rebengiuc, actor
Duncan Renaldo, actor (Romanian-born, achieved fame in America as The Cisco Kid, a hero to children of the 1950s)
Alexandru Repan, actor
Edward G. Robinson, actor (Romanian-born Jew, made career in United States as an English-language film actor)
Aristizza Romanescu, actress

S
Geo Saizescu, actor
Alec Secăreanu, actor
Sebastian Stan, actor, naturalized American citizen
Silviu Stănculescu, actor
Carmen Stănescu, actress

T
Constantin Tănase, cabaretist

V
Tora Vasilescu, actress
Grigore Vasiliu Birlic, actor
Mircea Veroiu, actor, director, screenwriter
Dorel Vișan, actor

W
Johnny Weissmuller, actor (born in what is now Timișoara, Romania, ethnically German, made career in United States as an English-language film actor)

Z
Florin Zamfirescu, actor

References

 
Actors
Romania